Petro Mamu (born 16 September 1984) is an Eritrean mountain runner who won one World Mountain Running Championships (2012).

Biography
The 2017 World Long Distance Mountain Running Championships was rewritten and the gold medal was dropped by Eritrean Petro Mamu, disqualified for doping, and was assigned to the Italian Francesco Puppi.

References

External links
 
 Petro Mamu at Association of Road Racing Statisticians

1984 births
Living people
Place of birth missing (living people)
Eritrean mountain runners
Eritrean long-distance runners
Doping cases in athletics
World Mountain Running Championships winners